Walter Müller (born 27 August 1970) is a retired Swiss football goalkeeper.

References

1970 births
Living people
Swiss men's footballers
FC Aarau players
Association football goalkeepers
Place of birth missing (living people)
20th-century Swiss people